Cheryl Ruddock is a Canadian-American painter from Guelph, Canada, who has been exhibiting widely for over 20 years. Her most recent solo exhibition, Harmonics, was exhibited at Gallery Stratford, in 2016. A career survey of her work, entitled Slip, was held at the Macdonald Stewart Art Centre, now the Art Gallery of Guelph, in 2010.

Ruddock received her Bachelor's in Fine Arts from the University of Guelph. Her paintings and prints belong to the following public collections: The Canada Council Art Bank, The Art Gallery of Hamilton, The Macdonald Stewart Art Centre, University of Guelph Collection, Kitchener-Waterloo Art Gallery, University of Waterloo Art Gallery and Glenhyrst, Art Gallery of Brant.

Art Practice

Her subjects include recurring mythic symbols, such as the female form, empty clothing, and desiccated botanicals.

Ruddock works with oil and acrylic on canvas, including shaped canvas bound to wooden forms. Periodically, she creates monoprints with master printer Stu Oxley at the Riverside Press, in Elora, Ontario.

Representation

Ruddock is currently represented by Renann Isaacs, Guelph, and Joan Ferneyhough, North Bay. Her paintings belong to public, private, and corporate collections across Canada and the United States.

References

20th-century Canadian painters
21st-century Canadian painters
Canadian women painters
20th-century Canadian women artists
21st-century Canadian women artists